Nasya Dimitrova (Bulgarian Cyrillic: Нася Димитрова) (born on 6 November 1992) is an international volleyball player from Bulgaria. She participated in the 2018 FIVB Volleyball Women's World Championship. 2019 FIVB Volleyball Women's Nations League. and 2021 Women's European Volleyball League, winning a gold medal.

She currently plays for Bulgaria and CS Dinamo București as middle blocker.

References 

1992 births
Living people
People from Yambol
Bulgarian women's volleyball players
European Games competitors for Bulgaria
Middle blockers
Volleyball players at the 2015 European Games